The 50th Bodil Awards ceremony was held in 1997 in Copenhagen, Denmark, honouring the best national and foreign films of 1996. Lars von Trier's Breaking the Waves won the award for Best Danish Film and Emily Watson and Katrin Cartlidge won the awards for best leading and supporting actresses. Max von Sydow for his role in Hamsun and Zlatko Buric won the award for best supporting actor for his role in Pusher. Bodil Kjær, one of the two film people named Bodil for whom the statuette is named, the other being Bodil Ipsen, received a Bodil Honorary Award, bringing her total number of Bodil wins up to four.

Winners

Bodil Honorary Award 
Bodil Kjær

See also 
 Robert Awards

References

External links 
 Official website

1996 film awards
1997 in Denmark
Bodil Awards ceremonies
1990s in Copenhagen